Dominique Thibault (born August 26, 1988) is an ice hockey player for the Montreal Stars and a former reality tv contestant.

Playing career

NCAA
Thibault spent the first three years of her NCAA career with the Connecticut Huskies women's ice hockey program. In 2009-10, she played her senior season with the Clarkson Golden Knights women's ice hockey program. As part of her only season with the Golden Knights, she helped Clarkson reach the ECAC Championship Tournament for the second time in the program’s history and made its first ever NCAA Tournament appearance in 2010. In addition, Thibault was the Golden Knights leading scorer. She was part of the ECAC All-Star team that played the US National women's ice hockey team in fall 2010.

Montreal Stars
Thibault was part of the Montreal Stars 2011 Clarkson Cup championship team. In the championship game, she was named the First Star of the Game. She would also be part of the 2012 Clarkson Cup title team.

Career stats

NCAA

CWHL

Hockey Canada

Awards and honours
2007 Hockey East All-Rookie team
2008 Second Team RBK All-American
2007-08 Hockey East First Team All-Star
2008 Hockey East Player of the Year
2008 New England Hockey Writers Division I Women's All-Star team
2009 All-Hockey East Second-Team
2010 ECAC Third-Team All-Star

Personal
Thibault appeared in the hockey reality show titled La série Montréal-Québec. She helped Team Quebec to hoist the television championship for an audience of over 1.5 million viewers. Stars teammate Jenny Lavigne also participated with Team Quebec.

References

1988 births
Living people
Canadian women's ice hockey forwards
Clarkson Cup champions
Montreal Axion players
Les Canadiennes de Montreal players
Ice hockey people from Montreal